Starve Hollow State Recreation Area is a state recreation area in Vallonia, Indiana. The  recreation area was created from part of the larger Jackson–Washington State Forest. The area offers fishing, swimming, hiking, and a nature center. 

Starve Hollow Lake, which is part of the area, is very shallow as a result of sediment
entering the lake from nearby fields. Aquatic vegetation, such as lilly pads Nymphaeaceae and cattails among other types, covers much of the lake, especially in the northern and eastern areas of the lake. The lake is stocked with largemouth bass, bluegill and redear sunfish as well as channel catfish. The surrounding hardwood forests contain white-tailed deer, ruffed grouse, eastern wild turkey, rabbit, quail, dove, squirrel, fox, coyote, and raccoon as well as many non-game species. Bald eagles have been seen during winter in recent years when the lake is ice-free.

There are two campgrounds at Starve Hollow. The main campground offers several waterfront campsites. The other campground is west of the lake and is designed for larger recreational vehicles.

The Indiana Department of Natural Resources has announced plans to drain the lake in the fall of 2008 in order to repair the dam and to eradicate gizzard shad which are detrimental to the fishery.

References

Parks in Indiana
Protected areas of Jackson County, Indiana